Neil Edwards may refer to:
 Neil Edwards (rugby union) (born 1964), Scottish rugby union international
 Neil Edwards (footballer, born 1967), English footballer
 Neil Edwards (footballer, born 1970), Welsh footballer
 Neil Edwards (cricketer) (born 1983), English cricketer